The black-banded barbet (Psilopogon javensis) is a bird species in the Megalaimidae family.
It is endemic to Java and Bali.

Its natural habitats are subtropical or tropical moist lowland forests and subtropical or tropical moist montane forests. It is threatened by habitat loss.

References

black-banded barbet
Birds of Java
Birds of Bali
black-banded barbet
Taxonomy articles created by Polbot